Cantharocnemis is a genus of longhorn beetles of the subfamily Prioninae. The species in the genus are mainly found in Africa with a few species in Asia.

Species
 Cantharocnemis antennatus Franz, 1938 
 Cantharocnemis burchelli Westwood, 1866 
 Cantharocnemis downesi Pascoe, 1858 
 Cantharocnemis durantoni Drumont, 2006 
 Cantharocnemis fairmairei Lameere, 1902 
 Cantharocnemis felderi Westwood, 1866 
 Cantharocnemis filippovi Plavilstshikov, 1933 
 Cantharocnemis kraatzi Thomson, 1860 
 Cantharocnemis lameerei Gilmour, 1956 
 Cantharocnemis livingstonei Westwood, 1866 
 Cantharocnemis minor Kolbe, 1898 
 Cantharocnemis occidentalis Gilmour, 1956 
 Cantharocnemis plicipennis Fairmaire, 1887 
 Cantharocnemis somalius Gahan, 1894 
 Cantharocnemis spondyloides Audinet-Serville, 1832
 Cantharocnemis strandi Plavilstshikov, 1933

References
 Biolib

Prioninae